Mick Fealty (born 1959) is a communications consultant and founding editor of the Northern Ireland-based blog Slugger O'Toole.

Fealty was born in Belfast and grew up in Holywood, County Down, but now lives in Gloucestershire, England.

He has been a blogger for The Daily Telegraph and occasional contributor to The Guardian's Comment is Free site. He has also written for The Irish Times, The Financial Times, The Observer, Prospect Magazine, the Sunday Independent and Belfast Telegraph. He was a visiting research fellow at the Institute of Governance at Queen's University Belfast between December 2004 and August 2008.

He works as a consultant on online engagement and works with a range of public, voluntary and private sector organisations. He has given talks for London-based Editorial Intelligence, the US Institute of Medicine, the Reuters Institute at Oxford University, and the UTV.

Publications include: A Long Peace: the future of Unionism in Northern Ireland (2003); Public Diplomacy, Cultural Interventions & the Peace Process in Northern Ireland, Annenberg School of Communication, University of Southern California (2009).

Awards

 Best Current Affairs / Political blog Littlewoods Ireland Blog Awards 2016 and 2017
Longlisted for the Orwell Blog Prize in 2012
"Best Political Blog" in  Galway at the Irish Blog Awards in 2010.
Winner the Peace Through Media Award 2009 from the International Council for Press and Broadcasting BBC Report:
Shortlisted for Politics Online's "The Top 10 Who Are Changing the World of Internet and Politics" 2006 and 2009.
"Best Website of the Month" and specially commended in the "Website of the Year Award" at the BT GoldenEye T Awards in May 2006.
First in the "Best Political Blog" section in the Irish Blog Awards in 2006.
In 2005 it won "Best European Political Weblog" in the first Satin Pajamas competition held by A Fistful of Euros. .
It won the New Statesman "New Media Award" for community and information in 2004.

References

External links
Personal website
Profile at Guardian Comment is Free
Mick Fealty at The Telegraph

Living people
Bloggers from Northern Ireland
Journalists from Northern Ireland
People associated with Queen's University Belfast
Writers from Belfast
1959 births
21st-century writers from Northern Ireland
Male non-fiction writers from Northern Ireland
Male bloggers
Irish bloggers